Synageles noxiosus is a species of jumping spider. It is found in Canada, the United States, Mexico, and the Bahamas.

References

External links
 

Salticidae
Articles created by Qbugbot
Spiders described in 1850